The Paris metropolitan area is an area that describes the reach of commuter movement to and from Paris.

The Paris metropolitan area may also refer to:
 The Paris, Texas micropolitan area, United States
 The Paris, Tennessee micropolitan area, United States

See also
Paris (disambiguation)